Bamra railway station is a railway station on the South Eastern Railway network in the state of Odisha, India. It serves Bamra town. Its code is BMB. It has three platforms. Passenger, Express and Superfast trains halt at Bamra railway station.

Major trains

 Shalimar–Lokmanya Tilak Terminus Express
 Dhanbad–Alappuzha Express
 Howrah–Ahmedabad Superfast Express
 Rourkela–Bhubaneswar Intercity Express
 Tapaswini Express
 Rourkela–Gunupur Rajya Rani Express
 Samaleshwari Express
 Ispat Express
 South Bihar Express
 Sambalpur–Jammu Tawi Express
 Kalinga Utkal Express

References

See also
 Sambalpur District

Railway stations in Sambalpur district
Chakradharpur railway division